MTV Greece was a Greek free-to-air regional television channel launched on 1 September 2008, replacing Smart TV. Owned by Radio TV Piraeus S.A., it closed down suddenly on 11 January 2016, one year prior the proper MTV copyrights come to an end, despite the good ratings. It was replaced by RISE on terrestrial television. Also, it OTE TV and Nova subscription providers, it was replaced by MTV Global and MTV Live.

MTV Greece used to air mainly British, American and Greek music, MTV original shows like Date My Mom, Made, Nitro Circus, Room Raiders, America's Most Smartest Model, etc. subtitled in Greek, as well as three Greek shows (Hitlist Hellas, MTV Pulse, MTV Take 20). It was available on terrestrial television in Athens and via satellite to the rest of the country and Cyprus. MTV also launched MTV Plus, a regional spin-off channel based in Thessaloniki.

MTV Greece's launch event took place in Panathenaic Stadium on 5 October 2008 with live performances from R.E.M., Kaiser Chiefs, Gabriella Cilmi, and C Real. The concert was also broadcast live in Italy, France, Portugal and Spain on MTV. On 9 October 2009 MTV organized the first MTV Day, a celebration for the 1 year of airing in Greece.

MTV held a concert at the Olympic Indoor Hall, in Athens, with quests Myronas Stratis, Professional Sinnerz, Moral, Aloha From Hell and Tokio Hotel. The concert was recorded and was later shown on the MTV World Stage.

A high-definition feed of the channel was launched on 17 October 2011.

Closed on 11 January 2016 and replaced by Rise.

Programming
The channel combined local and international music, and aired international MTV shows (with Greek subtitles) including Jackass, Pimp My Ride, When I Was 17, If You Really Knew Me, My Super Sweet 16, Viva La Bam, Life of Ryan, 16 and Pregnant, as well as some original content produced exclusively for Greece.

Local Shows
MTV News - Music and entertainment news updates.
Your Noise Live - Daily variety program with music, news, games and interviews.
MTV Take 20 - Weekly show focuses on movie news, trailers, interviews and a look at the latest new releases.
MTV Headbangers Ball - Heavy metal music videos and news.
MTV Game On - Weekly show focuses on video games.
Every Day Girls! - Weekly show focuses on girls, fashion, horoscopes, entertainment and celebrity news and interviews. 
MTV New Generation
Yo! MTV Raps
myMTV
Mission Lydia - Entertainment program hosted by Lydia Papaioannou
MTV Summer Clash
MTV SHOW US YOUR STYLE
MTV Greeklips
Wake Up with MTV
MTV Coolwave Challenges
Only Hits
Clip Of The Week
Your Noise Daily
MTV City Life
Party Zone

Presenters and VJs
Nafsika Lalioti
Katerina Tsavalou
Lydia Papaioannou
Konstantinos Koutsoumpas
Vanessa Christodoulou
Orfeas Spiliotopoulos
Thomas Protopapas
Vasiliki Arvanitaki
Estel Ameti
Marianthi Mpairaktari
Myrto Kazi
Giorgos Satsidis
Spiros Margaritis

Spinoff channels

MTV Plus

Launched on 18 October 2009, MTV Plus was a regional channel available in Thessaloniki. Its programming was similar to its sister channel MTV Greece. On 13 December 2011 it was replaced by Nickelodeon Plus.

MTV Music

Launched on 7 October 2009, MTV Music was a 24-hour music channel playing non-stop music videos, live performances and artist interviews. It closed on 2011 and was replaced by MTV Greece and, from 17 October 2011, MTV HD.

MTV HD
MTV HD was launched on 17 October 2011 on OTE TV.

Closure
MTV was closed from Greece territories on 11 January 2016 and replaced by Rise.

See also
Paramount Networks EMEAA
Music of Greece

References

External links
Official site of RISE TV

2008 establishments in Greece
2016 disestablishments in Greece
MTV channels
Defunct television channels in Greece
Greek-language television stations
Music organizations based in Greece
Mass media in Athens
Television channels and stations established in 2008
Television channels and stations disestablished in 2016